Myrtle Lawn is a historic plantation house and national historic district located near Enfield, Halifax County, North Carolina. It encompasses seven contributing buildings and one contributing site, the farm landscape.  The house was built about 1816 and expanded about 1850. It is a two-story, five bay, Federal style frame dwelling.  Also on the property are the contributing carriage house (1840s), an office (1858), a slave house, a vegetable storage structure, a dairy, and other food and storage buildings.

It was listed on the National Register of Historic Places in 1985.

References

Plantation houses in North Carolina
Farms on the National Register of Historic Places in North Carolina
Historic districts on the National Register of Historic Places in North Carolina
Federal architecture in North Carolina
Houses completed in 1816
Buildings and structures in Halifax County, North Carolina
National Register of Historic Places in Halifax County, North Carolina
1816 establishments in North Carolina